Edwin Thoms (or Thomas) Cox (9 January 1881 – 18 December 1967) was a New Zealand politician and Mayor of Dunedin. He was Dunedin's first Labour mayor. He had been a Methodist minister.

Biography
He was born in Marton, and was educated at Prince Albert College, Auckland, the University of Auckland and the Victoria University of Wellington from which he graduated in 1915 with first class honours in history.

A Methodist minister since 1916, he was Superintendent of the Auckland Central Mission for six years, then minister of the Central Church, Wanganui for eight years before moving to the Mornington Methodist Church, Dunedin in 1932.

In 1933 he successfully stood for the mayoralty of Dunedin as an independent with Labour backing. His programme for Dunedin included work for the unemployed and for adequate housing for all citizens, although not all his proposals were accepted by the Council. In 1938 he again stood for mayor and was defeated, partly as no previous Dunedin mayor had stood three times. The opposition Citizens Association and the Otago Daily Times attacked him in a vitriolic campaign, with references to "municipal sovietism".

While Mayor and after his defeat he worked as a land agent. In 1967 Cox and his wife Winifred (who he had married in 1912) moved to Adelaide, where he died in December.

References

1881 births
1967 deaths
People from Marton, New Zealand
Mayors of Dunedin
New Zealand Methodist ministers
University of Auckland alumni
Victoria University of Wellington alumni
Unsuccessful candidates in the 1935 New Zealand general election
Unsuccessful candidates in the 1943 New Zealand general election
People educated at Prince Albert College
New Zealand Labour Party politicians